NGC 6885, also Caldwell 37, is an open cluster in the constellation Vulpecula. It shines at magnitude +5.7/+8.1. Its celestial coordinates are RA , dec . It surrounds the naked eye Be star 20 Vulpeculae, and is located near M27 (Dumbbell nebula), the nebula IC 4954, and open clusters NGC 6882 and NGC 6940. It is 7'/18' across.

Notes

References

External links 
 

 
 SEDS – NGC 6885
 VizieR – NGC 6885
 NED – NGC 6885

Open clusters
6885
037b
Vulpecula